Sunbeam is an unincorporated community in Moffat County, in the U.S. state of Colorado.

History
A post office called Sunbeam was established in 1912, and remained in operation until 1942. The community was named for the ample sunshine at the town site.

In Popular Culture
Sunbeam was mentioned in the 2022 movie Blood Relatives.

References

Unincorporated communities in Moffat County, Colorado
Unincorporated communities in Colorado